Krzysztof Job (born 28 January 1963) is a Polish football manager and former player who played as a defender.

References

1963 births
Living people
People from Sucha County
Polish footballers
Association football defenders
Górnik Zabrze players
Odra Opole players
Ekstraklasa players
I liga players
Polish football managers
Odra Opole managers